The following is a list of Sites of Special Scientific Interest in the North East Fife Area of Search, in Scotland. For other areas, see List of SSSIs by Area of Search.

 Ballo and Harperleas Reservoirs
 Balmerino - Wormit Shore
 Bankhead Moss
 Barnsmuir Coast
 Black Loch (Abdie)
 Cameron Reservoir
 Cassindonald Moss
 Craighall Den
 Craigmead Meadows
 Dunbog Bog
 Earlshall Muir
 Eden Estuary
 Fife Ness Coast
 Firth of Forth
 Fleecefaulds Meadow
 Flisk Wood
 Inner Tay Estuary
 Isle of May
 Kilconquhar Loch
 Lacesston Muir and Glen Burn Gorge
 Lady Loch
 Lindores Loch
 Lochmill Loch
 Morton Lochs
 North Fife Heaths
 Pickletillem Marsh
 St Andrews - Craig Hartle
 St Michaels Wood Marshes
 Swinky Muir
 Tayport-Tentsmuir Coast
 Torflundie Mire
 Turflundie Wood
 Waltonhill and Cradle Den

References

 
North East Fife